Aljand is a surname. Notable people with the surname include:

 Berit Aljand (born 1985), Estonian swimmer
 Martti Aljand (born 1987), Estonian swimmer
 Triin Aljand (born 1985), Estonian swimmer, sister of Martti